The 1961–62 Scottish Division One was won by Dundee by three points over nearest rival Rangers. It is the only Scottish League title win in Dundee's history. St Johnstone and Stirling Albion finished 17th and 18th respectively and were relegated to the 1962-63 Second Division. St Johnstone were relegated on goal average, with the teams in 15th, 16th and 17th all finishing on 25 points.

League table

Results

References

1
Scottish Division One seasons
Scot